is the eleventh studio album by Japanese singer Yōko Oginome. Produced by Ken Yoshida and released through Victor Entertainment on August 21, 1990, the album features the hit single "Gallery", but with lyrics different from the single version. The album was reissued on April 21, 2010 with five bonus tracks as part of Oginome's 25th anniversary celebration. 

The album peaked at No. 5 on Oricon's albums chart and sold over 46,000 copies.

Track listing

Charts

References

External links
 
 
  

1990 albums
Yōko Oginome albums
Japanese-language albums
Victor Entertainment albums

ja:KNOCK ON MY DOOR